Maschwitz may refer to:

People 
Eric Maschwitz (1901– 1969), English entertainer, writer, editor, broadcaster and broadcasting executive
Stu Maschwitz, was the co-founder and chief technology officer of The Orphanage, a visual effects company that was based in California

Places 
Ingeniero Maschwitz, is a town in the Escobar Partido of the Buenos Aires Province, Argentina